Thury-Harcourt-le-Hom (known as Le Hom before 2022) is a commune in the department of Calvados, northwestern France. The municipality was established on 1 January 2016 by merger of the former communes of Thury-Harcourt (the seat), Caumont-sur-Orne, Curcy-sur-Orne, Hamars and Saint-Martin-de-Sallen.

Le Hom officially changed its name to Thury-Harcourt-le-Hom effective January 1, 2022.

Population

See also 
Communes of the Calvados department

References 

Thuryharcourtlehom
Populated places established in 2016
2016 establishments in France